The 14th Washington D.C. Area Film Critics Association Awards were announced on December 7, 2015.

Winners and nominees

Best Film
 Spotlight
 Brooklyn
 Mad Max: Fury Road
 The Revenant
 Sicario

Best Director
 George Miller – Mad Max: Fury Road
 Alex Garland – Ex Machina
 Todd Haynes – Carol
 Alejandro G. Iñárritu – The Revenant
 Ridley Scott – The Martian

Best Actor
 Leonardo DiCaprio – The Revenant
 Matt Damon – The Martian
 Johnny Depp – Black Mass
 Michael Fassbender – Steve Jobs
 Eddie Redmayne – The Danish Girl

Best Actress
 Saoirse Ronan – Brooklyn
 Cate Blanchett – Carol
 Brie Larson – Room
 Sarah Silverman – I Smile Back
 Charlize Theron – Mad Max: Fury Road

Best Supporting Actor
 Idris Elba – Beasts of No Nation
 Paul Dano – Love & Mercy
 Tom Hardy – The Revenant
 Mark Rylance – Bridge of Spies
 Sylvester Stallone – Creed

Best Supporting Actress
 Alicia Vikander – Ex Machina
 Jennifer Jason Leigh – The Hateful Eight
 Rooney Mara – Carol
 Alicia Vikander – The Danish Girl
 Kate Winslet – Steve Jobs

Best Adapted Screenplay
 Emma Donoghue – Room
 Drew Goddard – The Martian
 Nick Hornby – Brooklyn
 Phyllis Nagy – Carol
 Aaron Sorkin – Steve Jobs

Best Original Screenplay
 Pete Docter, Meg LeFauve, and Josh Cooley (original story by Pete Docter and Ronnie del Carmen) – Inside Out
 Matt Charman, Ethan Coen, and Joel Coen – Bridge of Spies
 Alex Garland – Ex Machina
 Tom McCarthy and Josh Singer – Spotlight
 Amy Schumer – Trainwreck

Best Ensemble
 Spotlight
 The Big Short
 The Hateful Eight
 Steve Jobs
 Straight Outta Compton

Best Animated Film
 Inside Out
 Anomalisa
 The Good Dinosaur
 The Peanuts Movie
 Shaun the Sheep Movie

Best Documentary Film
 Amy
 Best of Enemies
 Cartel Land
 Going Clear
 The Look of Silence

Best Foreign Language Film
 Son of Saul • Hungary The Assassin • Taiwan
 Goodnight Mommy • Austria
 Mustang • France
 The Second Mother • BrazilBest Art Direction Colin Gibson and Lisa Thompson – Mad Max: Fury Road
 Judy Becker and Heather Loeffler – Carol
 Dante Ferretti and Francesca Lo Schiavo – Cinderella
 Jeff Melvin, Thomas E. Sanders, and Shane Vieau – Crimson Peak
 Jenny Oman, François Séguin, and Louise Tremblay – Brooklyn

Best Cinematography
 Emmanuel Lubezki – The Revenant
 Yves Bélanger – Brooklyn
 Roger Deakins – Sicario
 Edward Lachman – Carol
 John Seale – Mad Max: Fury Road

Best Editing
 Margaret Sixel – Mad Max: Fury Road
 Elliot Graham – Steve Jobs
 Stephen Mirrione – The Revenant
 Pietro Scalia – The Martian
 Joe Walker – Sicario

Best Original Score
 Jóhann Jóhannsson – Sicario
 Michael Brook – Brooklyn
 Carter Burwell – Carol
 Tom Holkenborg (aka Junkie XL) – Mad Max: Fury Road
 Ennio Morricone – The Hateful Eight

Best Youth Performance
 Jacob Tremblay – Room
 Abraham Attah – Beasts of No Nation
 Raffey Cassidy – Tomorrowland
 Oona Laurence – Southpaw
 Güneş Şensoy – Mustang

Multiple nominations and awards

These films had multiple nominations:

 7 nominations: Carol and Mad Max: Fury Road
 6 nominations: Brooklyn and The Revenant
 5 nominations: Steve Jobs
 4 nominations: The Martian and Sicario
 3 nominations: Ex Machina, The Hateful Eight, Room, and Spotlight
 2 nominations: Bridge of Spies, The Danish Girl, and Inside Out

The following films received multiple awards:

 3 wins: Mad Max: Fury Road
 2 wins: Inside Out, The Revenant, Room, and Spotlight

References

External links
 The Washington D.C. Area Film Critics Association

2015
2015 film awards